Margaret of Bavaria (7 November 1456 – 25 January 1501) was a princess of Bavaria-Landshut and by marriage Princess of the Palatinate.

Life 

Margaret was a daughter of the Duke Louis IX "the Rich" of Bavaria-Landshut (1417–1479) from his marriage to Amalia of Saxony (1436–1501), daughter of Elector Frederick II of Saxony

She married 1474, with an elaborate celebration in Amberg (the "Amberg Wedding") Philip, who later became Elector Palatine Philip the upright (1448–1508).  He had earlier turned down marriage candidates such as Mary of Burgundy and Anna, heiress of the county of Katzenelnbogen.  More than 1,000 guests were present at the wedding, including 14 ruling princes.  Large quantities of food were consumed, in addition to 110,000 liters of wine as well as 10,000 chickens.

Two years after the marriage, Philip became Elector of the Palatinate. In 1482 Margaret left Heidelberg, fleeing from the plague, for Winzingen Castle, where she gave birth to Frederick, who later became Elector Frederick II.

Thanks to his wife, Philip had a good relationship with her brother Duke George the rich, whose children married in 1499.  The dynastic union was the starting point of political and military cooperation between Bayern-Landshut and the Palatinate.  George, who had no male heir of his own, bequeathed his territory to his son in law and the son of his sister.

Offspring 
From her marriage, Margaret had the following children:
 Louis (2 July 1478 – 16 March 1544).
 Philip (5 July 1480 – 5 January 1541), Bishop of Freising (1498–1541) and of Naumburg (1517–41).
 Ruprecht (14 May 1481 – 20 August 1504), Bishop of Freising (1495–1498), father of Otto Henry, Elector Palatine.
 Frederick (9 December 1482 – 26 February 1556). He married; no issue.
 Elisabeth (16 November 1483 – 24 June 1522), married:
 in 1498 to William III, Landgrave of Hesse-Marburg;
 in 1503 to Philip I, Margrave of Baden.
 Georg (10 February 1486 – 27 September 1529), Bishop of Speyer (1515–1529).
 Henry (15 February 1487 – 3 January 1552), Bishop of Utrecht (1523–1529) and of Freising (1541–1552), Bishop of Worms (1523–1552).
 John III (7 May 1488 – 3 February 1538), Bishop of Regensburg (1507–1538).
 Amalie (25 July 1490 – 6 January 1524), married in 1513 to George I, Duke of Pomerania-Wolgast.
 Barbara (28 August 1491 – 15 August 1505).
 Helena (9 February 1493 – 4 August 1524), married in 1513 to Henry V, Duke of Mecklenburg-Schwerin.
 Wolfgang (31 October 1494 – 2 April 1558).
 Otto Henry (6 May 1496 – 31 May 1496).
 Catherine (14 October 1499 – 16 January 1526).

Ancestors

References 
 Max Spindler, Andreas Kraus: Handbook of Bavarian history, volume 3, p. 79 ff, C.H. Beck, 1995
 Franz Prechtl: The "Amberger Wedding" 1474: a "wedding" for Amberg, Amberger Tourist Association, 1997.

Footnotes 

Princesses of the Palatinate
1456 births
1501 deaths
People from Amberg
Electresses of the Palatinate
15th-century German people
15th-century German women
16th-century German people
16th-century German women
Burials at the Church of the Holy Spirit, Heidelberg
Daughters of monarchs